The IRB Pacific Rugby Cup 2008 was the third edition of the Pacific Rugby Cup competition.  First held in 2006, the 2008 edition, like its predecessors, featured 6 representative rugby union football teams; 2 from each of the three Pacific rugby unions - Fiji, Samoa and Tonga.

Tautahi Gold beat Upolu Samoa 11 points to 3 in the grand final match to win the Pacific Rugby Cup for 2008, becoming the first Tongan team, and the first team outside of Samoa, to win the trophy.

Teams
The 6 participating teams were:
Upolu Samoa and Savaii Samoa from Samoa
Fiji Warriors and Fiji Barbarians from Fiji
Tau'uta Reds and Tautahi Gold from Tonga

Format and schedule
The teams played a single round robin (home or away) series. The two top teams in the final standings met in the grand final match, with the first ranking team awarded home advantage.

The 2008 tournament followed the completion of Fiji's Colonial Cup, Samoa's National Provincial Championship and Tonga's Provincial Championship and provided the coaches of the three national teams with a competitive player development pathway just ahead of the IRB Pacific Nations Cup 2008.

Upolu Samoa began its title defence away to 2007 beaten finalists Tau'uta Reds in Nuku'alofa on April 19, while Fiji Warriors faced Tautahi Gold in Lautoka and 2006 champions Savaii Samoa played Fiji Barbarians in Apia. Four further rounds followed on consecutive weekends before the top two ranked teams contested the Grand Final on May 24.

Table
{| class="wikitable"
|-
!width=165|Team
!width=40|Played
!width=40|Won
!width=40|Drawn
!width=40|Lost
!width=40|For
!width=40|Against
!width=40|Point Difference
!width=40|Bonus Points
!width=40|Points
|- bgcolor=#ccffcc align=center
|align=left| Upolu Samoa
|5||4||0||1||90||49||+41||1||17
|- bgcolor=#ccffcc align=center
|align=left| Tautahi Gold
|5||3||0||2||97||75||+22||1||13
|- align=center
|align=left| Savaii Samoa
|5||3||0||2||81||81||0||1||13
|- align=center
|align=left| Fiji Barbarians
|5||2||0||3||72||90||-18||2||10
|- align=center
|align=left| Tau'uta Reds 
|5||2||0||3||84||95||-11||1||9
|- align=center
|align=left| Fiji Warriors 
|5||1||0||4||70||104||-34||3||7

|- bgcolor="#ffffff" align=center
|colspan="15"|Source: oceaniarugby.com
|}
{| class="wikitable collapsible collapsed" style="text-align:center; line-height:100%; font-size:100%; width:60%;"
|-
! colspan="4" style="border:0px" |Competition rules
|-
| colspan="4" |Points breakdown:4 points for a win2 points for a draw1 bonus point for a loss by seven points or less1 bonus point for scoring four or more tries in a match
Classification:Teams standings are calculated as follows:Most log points accumulated from all matchesMost log points accumulated in matches between tied teamsHighest difference between points scored for and against accumulated from all matchesMost points scored accumulated from all matches
|}

Match results

Round One

Round Two

Round Three

Round Four

Round Five

Final

References

External links
FORU website 

World Rugby Pacific Challenge
Pacific Rugby Cup
Pacific Rugby Cup
Pacific Rugby Cup
Pacific Rugby Cup
Pacific